The men's individual time trial, a part of the cycling events at the 1928 Summer Olympics, took place in Amsterdam. The race was won by the Danish rider Henry Hansen in 4 hours, 47 minutes, 18 seconds.

The results were also used to determine rankings for the team road race event.

Final classification

Source: Official results

References

Road cycling at the 1928 Summer Olympics
Cycling at the Summer Olympics – Men's individual time trial